Tarbell Creek is a  long second-order tributary to the Niobrara River in Keya Paha County, Nebraska.  This is the only "creek" of this name in the United States.  There are two "brooks", with the name of Tarbell Brook, one in New England and the other in New York.

Watershed

See also

List of rivers of Nebraska

References

Rivers of Keya Paha County, Nebraska
Rivers of Nebraska